1,2-Dichlorobenzene, or orthodichlorobenzene (ODCB), is an organic compound with the formula CHCl. This colourless liquid is poorly soluble in water but miscible with most organic solvents. It is a derivative of benzene, consisting of two adjacent chlorine atoms.

It is mainly used as a precursor chemical in the synthesis of agrochemicals, as a preferred solvent for dissolving and working with fullerenes, as an insecticide, and in softening and removing carbon-based contamination on metal surfaces.

Production and uses
1,2-Dichlorobenzene is obtained as a side-product of the production of chlorobenzene:
  +     →     +  HCl
The reaction also affords the 1,4- and small amounts of the 1,3-isomer. The 1,4- isomer is preferred over the 1,2- isomer due to steric hindrance. The 1,3- isomer is uncommon because it is a meta- compound, while chlorine, like all halogens, is an ortho/para- director in terms of electrophilic aromatic substitution.

It is mainly used as a precursor to 1,2-dichloro-4-nitrobenzene, an intermediate in the synthesis of agrochemicals.  In terms of niche applications, 1,2-dichlorobenzene is a versatile, high-boiling solvent. It is a preferred solvent for dissolving and working with fullerenes. It is an insecticide for termites and locust borers, historically used by the United States Forest Service to combat widespread bark beetle outbreaks.

1,2-Dichlorobenzene is also used in softening and removing carbon-based contamination on metal surfaces.

Safety
Data from human exposure to 1,2-dichlorobenzene shows that concentrations of 100 ppm have been reported to cause sporadic irritation of the eyes and respiratory tract. The Occupational Safety and Health Administration and the National Institute for Occupational Safety and Health have set occupational exposure limits at a ceiling of 50 ppm, over an eight-hour workday.

See also
 Chlorobenzene
 1,4-Dichlorobenzene

References

Chlorobenzenes
Organochloride insecticides
Halogenated solvents
Aromatic solvents